Profile is the debut album by American pianist and arranger Duke Pearson, featuring performances by Pearson with Gene Taylor and Lex Humphries. It was recorded in 1959 and released the same year on the Blue Note label. Like the following Tender Feelin's, Profile has been released singularly on CD only in Japan by Blue Note/EMI. However, at present, it can be found on the twofer Profile & Tender Feelin's – Duke Pearson Trio issued by Fresh Sound Records in May 2011. Duke dedicated this album to his mother, Emily Pearson, "the one responsible for my coming this far".

Reception
The AllMusic review awarded the album 3 stars.

Track listing
 "Like Someone in Love" (Johnny Burke, Jimmy Van Heusen) – 5:30
 "Black Coffee" (Sonny Burke, Paul Francis Webster) – 4:32
 "Taboo" (Margarita Lecuona, Bob Russell) – 4:57
 "I'm Glad There Is You" (Jimmy Dorsey, Paul Madeira) – 4:52
 "Gate City Blues" (Duke Pearson) – 5:09
 "Two Mile Run" (Pearson) – 5:54
 "Witchcraft" (Cy Coleman, Carolyn Leigh) – 5:42

Personnel
Duke Pearson – piano
Gene Taylor – bass
Lex Humphries – drums

References

Blue Note Records albums
Duke Pearson albums
1959 debut albums
Albums recorded at Van Gelder Studio
Albums produced by Alfred Lion